Stéphanie Pelletier is a Canadian writer from Quebec, whose short story collection Quand les guêpes se taisent won the Governor General's Award for French-language fiction at the 2013 Governor General's Awards.

She followed up with Dagaz, her debut novel, in 2014.

References

External links

1980s births
21st-century Canadian novelists
21st-century Canadian short story writers
Canadian women novelists
Canadian women short story writers
Canadian novelists in French
Canadian short story writers in French
Writers from Quebec
Living people
Governor General's Award-winning fiction writers
21st-century Canadian women writers